Margaret Anne Stanley, OBE FMedSci is a British virologist and epithelial biologist. She attended the Universities of London, Bristol, and Adelaide. As of 2018, she is an Emeritus Professor of Epithelial Biology in the Department of Pathology at University of Cambridge and a Fellow of the Academy of Medical Sciences. She is also an Honorary Fellow of the UK Royal College of Obstetricians and Gynaecologists and an honorary fellow of Christ's College, Cambridge. Stanley is a research scientist in the field of virology with particular focus on the human papillomavirus (HPV). Her research work has led to new scientific findings on HPV. Additionally, she uses her expertise on HPV to serve on multiple different advisory committees and journal editorial boards.

Research
Stanley's main research interest is the pathogenesis of HPV and she currently leads a research group focusing on the prevention and treatment of human papillomavirus infection, which causes cervical cancer.

Early in her research, she generated a non-tumorigenic human cervical keratinocyte cell line, W12, from a low-grade cervical lesion. W12 cells can harbor HPV-16 episomes, and thus allow researchers the ability to investigate the complex processes of cervical cancer development. Additionally, she helped to discover the temporal association between high-level chromosomal instability and high-risk human papillomavirus (HR-HPV) integration, a key step in cervical carcinogenesis, such that integration precedes chromosomal abnormalities.

She also studies the host cell responses to infection with the human papillomavirus in individuals who are immunodeficient, most commonly HIV-positive immunosuppressant individuals. Evidence from animal models show that a CD4(+) T cell-dominated Th1 response leads to regression of anogential warts, an effective cell-mediated immune response (CMI). She states that a failure to produce this effective CMI response to the human papillomavirus facilitates viral persistence and this can lead to the progression of high-grade disease and invasive cervical cancer.

Career 
From 2000 to 2003, she was a member of the Biotechnology and Biological Sciences Research Council (BBSRC). Since then, she has served on multiple UK Research Council committees.

From 2004 to 2010, she served on the Spongiform Encephalopathies Advisory Committee (SEAC). Stanley's involvement in the SEAC was to provide independent scientific data to the UK government on transmissible spongiform encephalopathies (TSEs) and advise the government's public health, food safety, and animal health policies.

In 2017, Stanley was recruited by the American Society of Clinical Oncology to be on a multidisciplinary expert panel that presented new evidence-based recommendations for the primary prevention of cervical cancer. The number of recommended dosages of the HPV vaccine varies based on resource availability, age, and sex. Stanley endorses the reduction of the recommended HPV vaccine dosage from 3 to 2 for children aged 14 and younger. Additionally, she states that there is preliminary evidence for the effectiveness of just one dosage of the HPV vaccine and further research needs to be conducted.

Currently, Stanley serves as an expert on HPV for the HPV subcommittee of the UK's Joint Committee on Vaccines and Immunisation. She also serves on the editorial board for the following scientific journals: Sexually Transmitted Infections, Journal of Clinical Virology, and Reviews in Medical Virology. Stanley is also working as a consultant for companies that market HPV vaccines. Some of these companies include GSK, MSD, and Sanofi Pasteur MSD.

Advocacy 
Stanley is a vocal advocate of HPV vaccination pre-puberty, specifically between the ages of 13 and early 20s. Stanley acknowledges that the recommended HPV vaccines have been shown to generate a high enough concentrations of antibodies to fight the virus. Stanley also urges that both sexes be vaccinated because both are susceptible to HPV-related illnesses. She endorses both of the licensed HPV L1 VLP vaccines, the bivalent vaccine for HPV types 16 and 18 (Cervarix) and the quadrivalent vaccine for HPV types 6, 11, 16, and 18 (Gardasil). Stanley states that both licensed HPV vaccines are safe and highly immunogenic.

Stanley is currently the Vice President of the International Papillomavirus Society (IPVS) and a member of the IPVS's Executive, Policy, and Strategy and Planning Committees. Her main work with the IPVS is to encourage nations to endorse and utilize the readily available and effective HPV vaccinations in order to help prevent and treat the HIV infection in young people.

Awards and honours
In 2004, Stanley was awarded an OBE for services to virology. In 2010, she was given the Lifetime Achievement Award by the American Society for Colposcopy and Cervical Pathology (ASCCP) for her contributions to cervical cancer and cervical precancers research. She also holds a lifetime award for achievement from the International Papillomavirus Society.

Key Papers

References

External links
University of Cambridge, Department of Pathology: Professor Margaret Stanley & Dr Jane Sterling
Interview with The Naked Scientists

Living people
Year of birth missing (living people)
English biologists
British virologists
Officers of the Order of the British Empire
Fellows of Christ's College, Cambridge
Fellows of the Academy of Medical Sciences (United Kingdom)
20th-century British women scientists
21st-century British women scientists
British women biologists
Women virologists